Fear Flatha Ó Gnímh (1540—1630) was an Irish poet.

Life

Fear Flatha Ó Gnímh was a member of a hereditary learned family based at Larne, County Antrim, who was bard for the O'Neills. His known surviving poems are

 A Niocláis, nocht an gcláirsigh!
 Beannacht ar anmain Éireann
 Cuimseach sin, a Fhearghail Óig
 Éireannaigh féin fionnLochlannaigh
 Mairg do-chuaidh re ceird ndúthchais
 Tairnig éigse fhuinn Gaoidheal
 Buaidhreadh cóighidh caoi Eanmhná 

Kinsella remarks: "His poetry, with its close-down of all positive feeling, dates ... to the time of confiscations and plantations in the early seventeenth century." Two of his poems, After the Flight of the Earls and The Passing of the Poets are featured on pages 162–164 of The New Oxford Book of Irish Verse, published in 1986.

A later member of the family, Eoin Ó Gnímh (fl. December 1699), would preserve a number of manuscripts compiled or collected by Dubhaltach Mac Fhirbhisigh.

See also

 Eochaidh Ó hÉoghusa
 Mathghamhain Ó hIfearnáin

References

 The New Oxford Book of Irish Verse, p. 400, ed., with translations, by Thomas Kinsella, Oxford University Press, 1986.
 The Celebrated Antiquary, p. 196, Nollaig Ó Muraíle, Maynooth, 1996.
 A Bardic Miscellany: Five Hundred Bardic poems from manuscripts in Irish and British libraries, edited by Damian McManus and Eoghan Ó Raghallaigh, Trinity Irish Studies, Dublin, 2010.

External links
 http://celt.ucc.ie/bardic.html
Fear Flatha Ó Gnímh at ricorso.net

Irish-language poets
People from County Antrim
17th-century Irish writers